The 2021 Missouri State Bears football team represented Missouri State University as a member of the Missouri Valley Football Conference (MVFC) for the 2021 NCAA Division I FCS football season. They were led by second-year head coach Bobby Petrino, and played their home games at Robert W. Plaster Stadium in Springfield, Missouri. This was the Bears 115th season overall and their 36th season as a member of the Missouri Valley Football Conference. The Bears came off a historic 2020 season which saw them return to the playoffs after a 30 year drought where they last made the playoffs in 1990. Entering the season the team was predicted to finish 6th in the conference. The Bears finished the regular season with an 8-3 record (5-2 in conference play) which was good enough for second place in the Valley and their best finish to a season since 1990. The 2021 team set and matched numerous school records. QB Jason Shelley broke several school records in total offense and passing yards. He broke the single season passing record, total offense in a game, total offense in a season, games with more than 200 passing yards and matched the record for passes completed in a game. WR Tyrone Scott set school records in receiving yards in a season, matched touchdown receptions in a season, and 100 yard receiving games in a season. Scott was also the first receiver in school history to eclipse a thousand receiving yards in a season. P Grant Burkett set school records in punting average in a game and punting average in a season. The Bears qualified for the playoffs for the second straight year and hosted UT- Martin in the first round. This was the first home playoff game in Springfield since 1990 when Missouri State hosted Idaho.

Previous season

 Missouri State entered the year with a new coach and low expectations. They were predicted to finish in 10th place in the MVFC Standings. The Fall Conference season was pushed to the Spring due to COVID-19 concerns. They played three non-conference games in the Fall and lost all 3. Even so, the Bears finished the 2020 season 5–5, 5–1 in MVFC play to finish in a two-way tie for first place.  The Bears won their 10th conference championship (shared with South Dakota State) and returned to the playoffs for the first time since 1990. They lost in the first round at North Dakota 44–10. Bobby Petrino won the conference coach of the year award in his first season. They finished the season ranked 13th in both Coaches and STATS poll. The last time the Bears finished the season was ranked was in 1996, when they finished the season ranked 23rd.

Offseason

Recruiting
The Bears signed 11 freshman for the 2021 class. They added four players from the state including late addition Kaden McMullen who was the best QB in Missouri and number 5 in the 2021 class according to ESPN. Other highlights include TE Gary Clinton who was 29 overall and the 3rd best TE in Missouri, 3 star QB Hess Horne from Alabama, 3 star OL Brett Harris from Kansas City, and 2 star DL Sterling Smithson from Kansas.

Transfers
Incoming

Missouri State brought in 18 transfers in the 2021 class, who were eligible to play right away. Several players have started right away on offense like Junior QB Jason Shelley from Utah State, Senior OL Sean Fitzgerald from Coastal Carolina, Sophomore WR Tyrone Scott from Central Michigan, and RS Senior WR Xavier Lane from Western Kentucky.  Defensively, Senior LB Dimitri Moore from Vanderbilt, Freshman DB Donovan Clark from Boise State, and Junior CB Javian Smith have all made impacts.

Preseason

MVFC Media Poll
The Media picked the Bears to finish in 6th place. This was the highest prediction for the Bears since 2010.

Preseason Awards
Missouri State had seven players selected to the 2021 All-MVFC Preseason Team. 5 from the defense, 1 from the offense, and 1 from the specialists. The Bears had one player picked to the first team which was Junior defensive back, Montrae Braswell. 6 players were chosen to the second team.

Personnel

Coaching Staff
Bobby Petrino's coaching staff remained the same from 2020. Ryan Beard remained with the Bears as the defensive coordinator. Nick Petrino remained with  the Bears as the offensive coordinator/ quarterbacks coach. Petrino received a pay raise as well following the successful 2020 season. Other members of the coaching staff such as offensive coordinator Nick Petrino, defensive line coach L.D. Scott, running backs coach Ronnie Fouch and defensive coordinator Ryan Beard also earned extensions and raises.

Roster

Schedule
The Bears opened the season at Big 12 member Oklahoma State with a night game at Boone Pickens Stadium; where they lost a close matchup, 23-16. The Bears returned home for 2 straight at Plaster Stadium when they faced off with Central Arkansas and their first conference game with South Dakota for family weekend. Missouri State avenged 2 losses to UCA last fall with a 43-34 victory. They also beat South Dakota 31-23 to conclude the homestand. An early bye week split the two home games. Following the South Dakota game the Bears went on the road for two straight. They traveled to Illinois State where they won 41-20. Concluding the road trip was a game at Youngstown State where they lost 41-33. The team returned home for Homecoming against the Indiana State Sycamores where they crushed the Sycamores 37-7. North Dakota State in Fargo awaited Missouri State after Homecoming and the Bears lost 27-20 after leading late. A rematch of the playoff game from last season with North Dakota at home awaited the team and after a frantic 4th quarter comeback they got their revenge and won 32-28. The Bears traveled to Carbondale and beat the #7 Salukis 38-28. For their last home game of the year against Northern Iowa the team scored late to win 34-27. A late non-conference road trip to St. George to new division 1 school Dixie State ended the regular season for the Bears. After qualifying for the FCS Playoffs, Missouri State hosted their first home play off game since 1990. In the regular season, Missouri State had three non conference games, 5 home games and 6 away games.

Game Summaries
Regular Season

at Oklahoma State

#19 Central Arkansas

South Dakota

at Illinois State

at Youngstown State

Indiana State (Homecoming)

at #3 North Dakota State

North Dakota

at #7 Southern Illinois

#20 Northern Iowa

at Dixie State

FCS Playoffs

#16 UT Martin

Awards and honors

Regular season
Missouri Valley weekly awards

In 2021, the Bears broke the program record of 11 conference weekly awards with 14 honors. QB Jason Shelley paced the team with 5 awards across "Valley Offensive Player of the Week" (2) and "Valley Newcomer of the Week" (3). WR Xavier Lane was the other Bears player to receive multiple awards; winning 1 as the "Valley Offensive Player of the Week" and 1 as the "Valley Newcomer of the Week". OT Landon Bebee was the lone selection as "Valley Offensive Lineman of the Week" while LB Ferrin Manulelua was the only player to be selected as "Valley Defensive Player of the Week". Missouri State had had 3 players chosen as "Special Teams Players of the Week" LB Steven Ward, CB Montrae Braswell, and K Jose Pizano. RB Tobias Little was the other "Valley Offensive Player of the Week", and RB Kevon Latulas won his award as "Newcomer of the Week".

Postseason
Missouri Valley Football Conference

Rankings

References

Missouri State
Missouri State Bears football seasons
2021 NCAA Division I FCS playoff participants
Missouri State Bears football